The Blackbirds, also known as the Merry Blackbirds, were a South African band led by Peter Rezant. Founded in Johannesburg in 1930 or 1931 and originally, the band included Griffiths Motsieloa and his pianist wife Emily.

References

South African musical groups